Yorkgate railway station serves the north of the city of Belfast, Northern Ireland. The station opened in 1992, replacing the previous York Road railway station nearby. As at May 2021 there are plans to rebuild Yorkgate.

History
Following the demolition of  station in 1992, a new station had to be constructed to serve the in-development Cross Harbour Rail Link.

The rest of the site of York Road station is now occupied by Northern Ireland Railways' central maintenance depot, while the old works remain, a few yards to the north and backing on to York Road itself. The majority of the depot is visible when passing by train.

Current service

Larne Line services on Saturday retain their half-hourly operation, but there are fewer peak-time trains. On Sundays, the service reduces to hourly operation.

Weekday services on the Derry~Londonderry Line also call at Yorkgate on an hourly basis.

On Saturdays, there is a slightly reduced number of Derry~Londondery Line trains, but remains largely similar. On Sundays, the service reduces to seven trains in each direction operating on a two-hourly basis. All services operate between Great Victoria Street and Londonderry Waterside, except for the final train of the day, which only operates as far as Coleraine.

Port of Belfast
Yorkgate is the nearest station to the Port of Belfast.

References

Railway stations in Belfast
Railway stations opened in 1992
Railway stations opened by NI Railways
Railway stations served by NI Railways
Railway stations serving harbours and ports in the United Kingdom
Railway stations in Northern Ireland opened in the 20th century